The EDDYS or The Entertainment Editors' Choice is an annual film event in the Philippines that honors craftsmen, actors, writers, directors, workers, and producers in the Philippine film industry.

The awards are given by the Society of Philippine Entertainment Editors (SPEEd), whose members are the entertainment editors of national broadsheets and top tabloids in the Philippines. The group was established in 2015.

Categories 

The awards are presented in the following 14 categories:

 Best Picture
 Best Director
 Best Actor
 Best Actress
 Best Supporting Actor
 Best Supporting Actress
 Best Screenplay
 Best Cinematography
 Best Visual Effects
 Best Musical Score
 Best Production Design
 Best Sound
 Best Editing
 Best Original Theme Song

Special Awards 

 Joe Quirino Award
 Manny Pichel Award
 Producer of the Year
 Rising Producer Circle Award
 ICONS AWARD — (7 artists)
 Posthumous Honorees

Winners

2017
 Best Picture - Ang Babaeng Humayo
 Best Director - Lav Diaz (Ang Babaeng Humayo)
 Best Actor - Paolo Ballesteros (Die Beautiful)
 Best Actress - Vilma Santos (Everything About Her)
 Best Supporting Actor - John Lloyd Cruz (Ang Babaeng Humayo)
 Best Supporting Actress - Angel Locsin (Everything About Her)
 Best Screenplay - Everything About Her
 Best Cinematography - Seklusyon
 Best Visual Effects - Seklusyon
 Best Musical Score - Everything About Her
 Best Production Design - Die Beautiful
 Best Sound - Seklusyon
 Best Editing - Die Beautiful
 Best Original Theme Song - Saving Sally

2018
 Best Picture - Respeto
 Best Director - Mikhail Red (Birdshot)
 Best Actor - Aga Muhlach (Seven Sundays)
 Best Actress - Mary Joy Apostol (Birdshot)
 Best Supporting Actor - Dido dela Paz (Respeto)
 Best Supporting Actress - Angeli Bayani (Maestra), Therese Malvar (Ilawod) and Chai Fonacier (Respeto)
 Best Screenplay - Deadma Walking
 Best Cinematography - Birdshot
 Best Visual Effects - Ang Panday
 Best Musical Score - Respeto
 Best Production Design - Ang Larawan
 Best Sound - Respeto
 Best Editing - Kita Kita
 Best Original Theme Song - Respeto

2019

 Best Picture - Liway
 Best Director - Joel Lamangan (Rainbow's Sunset) 
 Best Actor - Dingdong Dantes (Sid & Aya) 
 Best Actress - Kathryn Bernardo (The Hows of Us) 
 Best Supporting Actor - Arjo Atayde (BuyBust) 
 Best Supporting Actress - Max Collins (Citizen Jake) 
 Best Screenplay - Zig Dulay (Liway)
 Best Cinematography - Yam Laranas (Aurora)
 Best Visual Effects - Aurora
 Best Musical Score - Bakwit Boys 
 Best Production Design - Goyo: Ang Batang Heneral 
 Best Sound - Bakwit Boys 
 Best Editing - Liway 
 Best Original Theme Song - Maybe The Night by Ben&Ben (Exes Baggage)

2020 

The 2020 Entertainment Editors’ Choice (Eddys) was cancelled. The Society of Philippine Entertainment Editors (SPEEd), the group which hands out the movie awards, released a statement in April announcing their decision to forgo The Eddys 2020.

2021 

The Society of Philippine Entertainment Editors, in partnership with the Film Development Council of the Philippines, held the first digital edition of The EDDYS on April 4, 2021. The awards night, which streamed live on various platforms (Facebook via Manila Standard, The Daily Tribune, and SPEEd pages; FDCPchannel.ph; and on Nickie Wang's YouTube channel VERY WANG) was hosted by Robi Domingo and directed by Ice Seguerra. Among the presenters were FDCP's Liza Dino, actor Dingdong Dantes, and Star for All Seasons Vilma Santos-Recto.

Here are the winners:

 Best Picture - Fan Girl
 Best Director - Antoinette Jadaone (Fan Girl)
 Best Actor - Paulo Avelino (Fan Girl)
 Best Actress - Charlie Dizon (Fan Girl)
 Best Supporting Actor - Edgar Allan Guzman (Coming Home)
 Best Supporting Actress - Shaina Magdayao (Tagpuan)
 Best Screenplay - Antoinette Jadaone (Fan Girl)
 Best Cinematography - Rody Lacap (Magikland)
 Best Visual Effects - Magikland
 Best Musical Score - On Vodka, Beer and Regrets and The Boy Foretold by the Stars
 Best Production Design - Ericson Navarro (Magikland)
 Best Sound - Vincent Villa (Fan Girl)
 Best Editing - Benjamin Tolentino (Fan Girl)
 Best Original Theme Song - "Ulan" (The Boy Foretold by the Stars)

SPECIAL AWARDS 
 Isah V. Red Award - Angel Locsin, Bong Revilla, Kim Chiu, Beautderm's Rhea Anicoche-Tan, Unilab's Claire de Leon-Papa, and Ramon Ang
 Rising Producer Circle Award - Black Sheep Productions 
 Producer of the Year - Idea First Company

History 

The inaugural The EDDYS was staged on July 8, 2017 at the Kia Theatre (now New Frontier Theatre) and was telecast on ABS-CBN. It was hosted by father and son Edu Manzano and Luis Manzano.

In 2018, The EDDYS collaborated with Globe Studios as major presenter while the awards night was produced by FM station, Wish 107.5. For the first time, The EDDYS staged a Nominees Night on June 3, 2018 at Valencia Events Place in Quezon City. It was co-sponsored by the Film Development Council of the Philippines (FDCP), headed by Chairman Liza Diño.

The 2nd EDDYS was held at Theatre at Solaire in Parañaque City on July 9, 2018. The show was directed by Paolo Valenciano and was hosted by siblings Ruffa Gutierrez and Raymond Gutierrez.

The third edition of the annual awards was held on July 14, 2019 at the New Frontier Theatre in Cubao Quezon City. The awarding ceremonies was telecast on Colours Channel. It was hosted by broadcast journalist and Rated K host Korina Sanchez with Lourd de Veyra as segment host.

In its 4th edition, EDDYS was supposed to introduce four additional categories to include local films that first premiered on streaming services like Netflix, iflix, iWant, and HOOQ. Due to COVID-19 pandemic, the awards night, which was slated on July 5 and to be hosted by Boy Abunda, was cancelled.

Events 

The Nominees Night, which is one of the most anticipated run-ups to the main event celebrates the creatives, talented artists, and film workers who are nominated in The EDDYS. The first and second edition was in partnership with the Film Development Council of the Philippines (FDCP).

Prior to the awarding ceremony for the 2nd EDDYS, cinematography, acting, scriptwriting, and sound design workshops were held in partnership with FDCP. Two best film nominees (TBA's Birdshot and T-Rex Entertainment's Deadma Walking) were also screened at FDCP's Cinematheque Center Manila. The free film showing was in line with Globe Studio's #playitright anti-piracy campaign.

Organization 
SPEEd (Society of the Philippine Entertainment Editors), the organization behind the annual The EDDYS, is made up of entertainment editors of newspapers and tabloid circulated daily nationwide. The non-profit organization was established in 2015 initially as a social club.

The organization was Initially formed as a social group led by its founding president, Manila Standard's former entertainment editor, Isah V. Red. He was succeeded by Manila Bulletin's Jojo Panaligan (2018) and then by People's Tonight's Ian Fariñas (2019).

SPEEd currently has 17 members and two honorary members.

Members 

 Tessa Mauricio-Arriola - The Manila Times
 Ervin Santiago - Bandera
 Rohn Romulo - People's Balita
 Salve Asis - Pilipino Star Ngayon, Pang Masa
 Neil Ramos - Tempo 
 Nestor Cuartero - Tempo
 Nickie Wang - Manila Standard 
 Maricris Nicasio - Hataw
 Dondon Sermino - Abante
 Dinah Ventura - Daily Tribune 
 Jerry Olea - Philippine Entertainment Portal
 Gie Trillana - Malaya Business Insights
 Isah V. Red - Daily Tribune 
 Ian Fariñas - People's Tonight 
 Eugene Asis - People's Journal 
 Janiz Navida - Bulgar
 Jojo Panaligan - Manila Bulletin

Honorary Member 

 Rito Asilo - Philippine Daily Inquirer

Philanthropy 

Apart from the annual awards show, the group behind The EDDYS also organizes events to give back to the community. SPEEd marked the founding of the organization with an outreach activity at the Anawim Home for the Abandoned and Rejected Elderlies in Barangay San Isidro in Rodriguez, Rizal. In its effort to advance entertainment journalism in the Philippines, SPEEd currently supports a Communication Arts student as the group's first scholar.

References 

Philippine film awards
Performing arts trophies
Awards established in 2017
2015 establishments in the Philippines